Trans-Bridge Lines is an interstate bus transportation company operating based in Bethlehem, Pennsylvania. It operates in New York, New Jersey, and Pennsylvania and offers daily service from the Lehigh Valley to both New York City and Philadelphia.

Services
Trans-Bridge Lines offers daily service to New York City, Newark and JFK airports from the Lehigh Valley area, Doylestown, New Hope, Pennsylvania and Clinton, Phillipsburg, Frenchtown, Lambertville, Flemington and Branchburg, New Jersey. Weekday service is available to Lower Manhattan, Wall Street, and Jersey City from the Lehigh Valley and Clinton.

Trans-Bridge Lines also offers daily service to Manhattan Cruise Terminal & Cape Liberty Pier in Bayonne. Charter Service is available throughout the U.S. and Canada.

An affiliate company, Trans-Bridge Tours, Inc., conducts retail tours through the United States and Canada. The tours include One-Day motorcoach excursions to Atlantic City and Pennsylvania casinos, sporting events, Broadway shows, festivals and more as well as Multi-Day overnight trips to many destinations. Vacation airline and cruise packages are also offered. Trans-Bridge Tours operates branch offices in Allentown and Bethlehem, Pennsylvania and Phillipsburg, New Jersey (closed October 2019) and is also an agent for Trans-Bridge Lines, selling tickets for the regular route service.

Routes

Connections are also available on certain Trans-Bridge schedules to Kennedy Airport, with service running to and from Terminal 4 at the Q10 bus stop, twice daily as well as Newark Airport.

Under contract to NJ Transit, Trans-Bridge Lines operates the 890 and 891 lines running between Pohatcong and Easton, PA, with connections available to LANTA routes in Downtown Easton at Center Square, as well as Trans-Bridge's line run via Route 22.

References

External links

Surface transportation in Greater New York
Transport companies established in 1941
Bus transportation in Pennsylvania
Bus transportation in New Jersey
Companies based in Bethlehem, Pennsylvania
Transportation in Allentown, Pennsylvania
1941 establishments in the United States